Khalida Rashid Khan is a Pakistani judge who became the first female judge in the Superior Judiciary of Pakistan. She also served as the president of the International Criminal Tribunal for Rwanda.

Early life 

She was born on 25 September 1949 in Peshawar, Pakistan.  Judge Khan obtained an LL.B. degree from Khyber Law College, Peshawar in 1969 and a Masters in Political Science degree from Peshawar University in 1971.

Career 

She was inducted into the provincial Judiciary in 1974 of North West Frontier Province as a Civil Judge. She then became a Senior Civil Judge, District and Sessions Judge and elevated as a judge of High Court Peshawar (Pakistan) in June 1994. She had also held many administrative positions, such as Registrar Peshawar High Court and Secretarial positions in the Justice and Law Department, NWFP.

She is a member of the International Association of Women Judges, U.S. and attended many international conferences. She contributed a paper to the Asia/South Pacific Regional Judicial Colloquium in Hong Kong on 20 May 1996, under the heading "Women and Human Rights in the Asia/Pacific Region, A perspective from South Asia". She presented a paper on "Judicial Creativity in Action" in Dublin, Ireland at the 6th Biennial Conference of International Association of Women Judges in May 2002. She has extensively worked to eradicate child labour in Pakistan and South Asia.

International Criminal Tribunal for Rwanda 

Judge Rashid Khan is an international judge and was appointed as president of the International Criminal Tribunal for Rwanda (ICTR) in 2011.

References 

 

1949 births
Living people
Judges of the Peshawar High Court
Hindkowan people
Pakistani women judges
International Criminal Tribunal for Rwanda judges
People from Peshawar
Pakistani judges of United Nations courts and tribunals